Mfou is a town in the south part of Cameroon. It is not far east of the capital, Yaoundé. It is a rural area and the activities of the inhabitants are basically subsistence agriculture.

Population 
In the 2005 census, the commune had 37,209 inhabitants, including 10,533 for the town of Mfou.

Tourism

See also 
 Centre Region (Cameroon)

References

External links 
 Mfou (in the French language)

Populated places in Centre Region (Cameroon)